Udu is a Local Government Area in Delta State, Nigeria with its local government headquarters is located at Otor-Udu. It has a population estimate of approximately 100,000 people. It is one of the Urhobo kingdoms, has its own king, or ovie. The town is about 10 minutes drive from Osubi Airport

Geography
The land is interlocked by rivers flowing across. It has a tropical weather and rain forest with evergreen vegetation and plantation all year round. Its geographical feature consists of numerous streams that inter-connect into an intricate web of rivers, lagoons, swamps and wetlands.

It is a boundary city/local government and a suburb of Warri metropolis and is connected from Enerhen by the Udu Bridge over Warri River.

Cultural heritage
The villages that makes up of the present Udu local government area are historically grouped into three sub-clans.

Evwrirhe Sub-clans
These are the villages and towns: Aladja, Ovwian, Emadadja, Egini, Obubu, Ubogo, Oleri, Oto Udu, Ogbe Udu, Ukpiovwin, Ukperheren, Ayama, Ekrota, Ugbisi, Owhrode, Ekete Oboto, Ekete Uburhie, Okolo Uburhie, Okolo Oboto, Ovworhokpokpo, Erhiephiho, Egiegi, Epame, Ujevwu, Oghior, Ohwase.

Oniere Sub-clan
These are Orho-Uwherun (Orhuwhorun) (Uwherun settlement), Igbogidi, and DSC Township, new town founded due to the construction of Delta Steel Company (DSC) at Aladja, Steel Township.

Uheredjo Sub-clans
These are Opete, Okpaka and Enerhen.

Economy
Udu's natural resources include rubber and rubber products, palm oil and palm products, cassava, fruits, vegetables and maize  available in large quantities. Silica is available in a nearby town for the manufacture of glass and also is crude oil, natural gas and other minerals for the petrochemical industry.

To the right of the Udu Bridge are the Delta Steel plant, Africa's first direct steel reduction variety of metallurgy, and Udu market. A Shell gas plant is located Otor-Udu, as well as other engineering companies.

A railway line links Itakpe-Ajaokuta to Aladja.

References

External links 
Delta State site

Local Government Areas in Delta State
Port cities and towns in Nigeria